The General Land Exchange Act of 1922 (16 U.S.C. 485, 486) was signed into law by  President of the United States Warren G. Harding on March 20, 1922
This act allowed the U.S. Forest Service to consolidate its holdings in national forests where a large percentage of private lands were intermingled with forest lands. It made possible the exchange of inholdings within national forests for private lands of equal value and within the same state.

This act also made for better management and administration in accordance with future planning initiatives because the process of a mutually desirable exchange was greatly simplified by this legislation to a matter of just signing papers.

Chief Forester William B. Greeley predicted in 1922 that "this law would probably be regarded as one of the half-dozen most important laws affecting the National Forests."

Notes

References
Godfrey, Anthony The Ever-Changing View-A History of the National Forests in California USDA Forest Service Publishers, 2005
Steen, Harold K. The United States Forest Service A History University of Washington Press, 1976

External links
 Cornell Law Library, text of law

United States federal public land legislation
1922 in law
1922 in the United States
United States federal legislation articles without infoboxes
History of forestry in the United States